The 2004 Supercopa de España was a two-legged Spanish football tie played on 21 and 24 August 2004. It was contested by 2003–04 Copa del Rey winners Zaragoza and 2003–04 La Liga winners Valencia. Zaragoza won the title 3–2 on aggregate.

Match details

First leg

Second leg

References
List of Super Cup Finals 2004 RSSSF.com

Supercopa de Espana Final
Supercopa de Espana 2004
Supercopa de Espana 2004
Supercopa de España